Hon. Frances Brooke (1640 – c. 1690) was a British courtier. She was styled Hon. Frances Brooke, and then Lady Whitmore. She was granted the style of a daughter of a baron in 1665.

Frances and her sister Margaret, Lady Denham, were two of the Windsor Beauties, painted by Sir Peter Lely for Anne Hyde, Duchess of York. Ironically Margaret was the mistress of Anne's husband, the future King James II. Her daughter Frances was one of the Hampton Court Beauties.

Family
Her father was Sir William Brooke (1601–1643), and her mother was his second wife Penelope Hill ( -c.1694), daughter of Sir Moyses Hill of Hillsborough, County Down and his first wife Alice McDonnell, and widow of Arthur Wilmot. Through her mother's third marriage Frances was the half-sister of the leading Whig statesman Edward Russell, 1st Earl of Orford.

She first married Sir Thomas Whitmore ( -1682), younger son of Sir Thomas Whitmore, 1st Baronet and Elizabeth Acton, (married some time before 1665). She then married Matthew Harvey ( -c.1693/94) (married sometime after 1682).

Frances had three children with her first husband, Sir Thomas Whitmore:
Henrietta Whitmore (1667-1697), who married Thomas Langley.
Frances Whitmore (7 November 1666 – 1695), who married Sir Richard Myddelton, 3rd Baronet.
Dorothy Whitmore (1668–1688).

References

External links
 

1640 births
1690 deaths
17th-century English women